The Alba motorcycle was manufactured at Stettin between 1919 and 1924 by Alfred Baruch. They featured four-stroke engines of 198cc, 247cc and 249cc capacity. Alba also manufactured three-wheeled delivery vans, as well as supplying engines to other manufacturers such as Huy and Teco. Although the company stopped manufacture in the mid-1920s, Alfred's son Manfred continued to supply spares up to the mid-1930s.

References

Motorcycle manufacturers of Germany